This is a list of electoral areas and wards in the ceremonial county and English region of Greater London. All changes since the re-organisation of local government following the passing of the London Government Act 1963 are shown. The number of councillors, common councilmen or assembly members elected for each electoral area or ward is shown in brackets.

London borough councils

Barking and Dagenham

Wards from 1 April 1965 (first election 7 May 1964) to 4 May 1978:

Wards from 4 May 1978 to 2 May 2002:

Wards from 2 May 2002 to 5 May 2022:

Wards from 5 May 2022:

Barnet

Wards from 1 April 1965 (first election 7 May 1964) to 9 May 1968:

Wards from 9 May 1968 to 2 May 2002:

Wards from 2 May 2002 to 5 May 2022:

Wards from 5 May 2022:

Bexley

Wards from 1 April 1965 (first election 7 May 1964) to 4 May 1978:

Wards from 4 May 1978 to 2 May 2002:

Wards from 2 May 2002 to 3 May 2018:

Wards from 3 May 2018 to present:

Brent

Wards from 1 April 1965 (first election 7 May 1964) to 9 May 1968:

Wards from 9 May 1968 to 4 May 1978:

Wards from 4 May 1978 to 2 May 2002:

Wards from 2 May 2002 to 5 May 2022:

Wards from 5 May 2022:

Bromley

Wards from 1 April 1965 (first election 7 May 1964) to 4 May 1978:

Wards from 4 May 1978 to 2 May 2002:

Wards from 2 May 2002 to 5 May 2022:

Wards from 5 May 2022:

Camden

Wards from 1 April 1965 (first election 7 May 1964) to 13 May 1971:

Wards from 13 May 1971 to 4 May 1978:

Wards from 4 May 1978 to 2 May 2002:

Wards from 2 May 2002 to 5 May 2022:

Wards from 5 May 2022:

Croydon

Wards from 1 April 1965 (first election 7 May 1964) to 4 May 1978:

Wards from 4 May 1978 to 2 May 2002:

Wards from 2 May 2002 to 3 May 2018:

Wards from 3 May 2018:

Ealing

Wards from 1 April 1965 (first election 7 May 1964) to 4 May 1978:

Wards from 4 May 1978 to 2 May 2002:

Wards from 2 May 2002 to 5 May 2022:

Wards from 5 May 2022:

Enfield

Wards from 1 April 1965 (first election 7 May 1964) to 6 May 1982:

Wards from 6 May 1982 to 2 May 2002:

Wards from 2 May 2002 to 5 May 2022:

Wards from 5 May 2022:

Greenwich

Wards from 1 April 1965 (first election 7 May 1964) to 4 May 1978:

Wards from 4 May 1978 to 2 May 2002:

Wards from 2 May 2002 to 5 May 2022:

Wards from 5 May 2022:

Hackney

Wards from 1 April 1965 (first election 7 May 1964) to 4 May 1978:

Wards from 4 May 1978 to 2 May 2002:

Wards from 2 May 2002 to 22 May 2014:

Wards from 22 May 2014 to present:

Hammersmith and Fulham

Wards from 1 April 1965 (first election 7 May 1964) to 4 May 1978:

Wards from 4 May 1978 to 2 May 2002:

Wards from 2 May 2002 to 5 May 2022:

Wards from 5 May 2022:

Haringey

Wards from 1 April 1965 (first election 7 May 1964) to 4 May 1978:

Wards from 4 May 1978 to 2 May 2002:

Wards from 2 May 2002 to 5 May 2022:

 
Wards from 5 May 2022:

Harrow

Wards from 1 April 1965 (first election 7 May 1964) to 4 May 1978:

Wards from 4 May 1978 to 2 May 2002:

Wards from 2 May 2002 to 5 May 2022:

Wards from 5 May 2022:

Havering

Wards from 1 April 1965 (first election 7 May 1964) to 4 May 1978:

Wards from 4 May 1978 to 2 May 2002:

Wards from 2 May 2002 to 5 May 2022:

Wards from 5 May 2022:

Hillingdon

Wards from 1 April 1965 (first election 7 May 1964) to 4 May 1978:

Wards from 4 May 1978 to 2 May 2002:

Wards from 2 May 2002 to 5 May 2022:

Wards from 5 May 2022:

Hounslow

Wards from 1 April 1965 (first election 7 May 1964) to 4 May 1978:

Wards from 4 May 1978 to 2 May 2002:

Wards from 2 May 2002 to 5 May 2022:

Wards from 5 May 2022:

Islington

Wards from 1 April 1965 (first election 7 May 1964) to 4 May 1978:

Wards from 4 May 1978 to 2 May 2002:

Wards from 2 May 2002 to 5 May 2022:

Wards from 5 May 2022:

Kensington and Chelsea

Wards from 1 April 1965 (first election 7 May 1964) to 2 May 1974:

Wards from 2 May 1974 to 2 May 2002:

Wards from 2 May 2002 to 22 May 2014:

Wards from 22 May 2014 to present:

Kingston upon Thames

Wards from 1 April 1965 (first election 7 May 1964) to 4 May 1978:

Wards from 4 May 1978 to 2 May 2002:

Wards from 2 May 2002 to 5 May 2022:

Wards from 5 May 2022 to present:

Lambeth

Wards from 1 April 1965 (first election 7 May 1964) to 4 May 1978:

Wards from 4 May 1978 to 2 May 2002:

Wards from 2 May 2002 to 5 May 2022:

Wards from 5 May 2022:

Lewisham

Wards from 1 April 1965 (first election 7 May 1964) to 4 May 1978:

Wards from 4 May 1978 to 2 May 2002:

Wards from 2 May 2002 to 5 May 2022:

Wards from 5 May 2022:

Merton

Wards from 1 April 1965 (first election 7 May 1964) to 4 May 1978:

Wards from 4 May 1978 to 2 May 2002:

Wards from 2 May 2002 to 5 May 2022:

Wards from 5 May 2022:

Newham

Wards from 1 April 1965 (first election 7 May 1964) to 4 May 1978:

Wards from 4 May 1978 to 2 May 2002:

Wards from 2 May 2002 to 5 May 2022:

Wards from 5 May 2022:

Redbridge

Wards from 1 April 1965 (first election 7 May 1964) to 4 May 1978:

Wards from 4 May 1978 to 2 May 2002:

Wards from 2 May 2002 to 3 May 2018:

Wards from  3 May 2018 to present:

Richmond upon Thames

Wards from 1 April 1965 (first election 7 May 1964) to 9 May 1968:

Wards from 9 May 1968 to 4 May 1978:

Wards from 4 May 1978 to 2 May 2002:

Wards from 2 May 2002 to 5 May 2022:

Wards from 5 May 2022:

Southwark

Wards from 1 April 1965 (first election 7 May 1964) to 9 May 1968:

Wards from 9 May 1968 to 4 May 1978:

Wards from 4 May 1978 to 2 May 2002:

Wards from 2 May 2002 to 3 May 2018:

Wards from 3 May 2018 to present:

Sutton

Wards from 1 April 1965 (first election 7 May 1964) to 4 May 1978:

Wards from 4 May 1978 to 2 May 2002:

Wards from 2 May 2002 to 5 May 2022:

Wards from 5 May 2022:

Tower Hamlets

Wards from 1 April 1965 (first election 7 May 1964) to 4 May 1978:

Wards from 4 May 1978 to 2 May 2002:

Wards from 2 May 2002 to 22 May 2014:

Wards from 22 May 2014 to present:

Waltham Forest

Wards from 1 April 1965 (first election 7 May 1964) to 4 May 1978:

Wards from 4 May 1978 to 2 May 2002:

Wards from 2 May 2002 to 5 May 2022:

Wards from 5 May 2022:

Wandsworth

Wards from 1 April 1965 (first election 7 May 1964) to 4 May 1978:

Wards from 4 May 1978 to 2 May 2002:

Wards from 2 May 2002 to 5 May 2022:

Wards from 5 May 2022:

Westminster

Wards from 1 April 1965 (first election 7 May 1964) to 9 May 1968:

Wards from 9 May 1968 to 4 May 1978:

Wards from 4 May 1978 to 2 May 2002:

Wards from 2 May 2002 to 5 May 2022:

Wards from 5 May 2022:

Sui generis council

City of London

Wards from March 2003 to 21 March 2013:

All wards elect one alderman.

Wards from 21 March 2013 to present:

All wards elect one alderman.

Former county council

Greater London Council

Electoral Areas from 1 April 1965 (first election 9 April 1964) to 12 April 1973:

There were also 16 aldermen elected.

Electoral Areas from 12 April 1973 to 1 April 1986 (county abolished):

There were also 16 aldermen elected, until they were abolished in 1977.

Regional assembly

London Assembly

Assembly constituencies from 3 July 2000 (first election 4 May 2000) to present:

There were also 11 London-wide assembly members elected.

Electoral wards by constituency

The wards in Greater London were most recently grouped into UK Parliament constituencies at the Fifth Periodic Review of Westminster constituencies in 2007.

See also
List of parliamentary constituencies in London

References

Wards of Greater London
Wards
Greater London